Earshot is a book of poems by Kimiko Hahn, published in 1992 by Hanging Loose Press. It is Hahn's second poetry collection, after Air Pocket (1989). The book contains 46 poems. In 1993, Earshot received an Association of Asian America Studies Literature Award. In 1995, it was awarded the Theodore Roethke Memorial Poetry Prize.

Contents

The 168th Street Men's Shelter, 1987
30 Seconds On Fred Carter
Afterbirth
Another Daughter
Brontosaurus
The Calf
Comp. Lit.: 1
Comp. Lit.: 2
Comp. Lit.: 3
Comp. Lit.: 4
Comp. Lit.: 5
Comp. Lit.: 6
Comp. Lit.: 7
Comp. Lit.: 8
Crossing Neptune Ave
Cruise Missiles
Day Lilies On The Second Anniversary Of My Second Marriage
Decomposition
Earshot
Fist
Foreclosure: A Series For J
The Girl's First Language
Going Inside To Write
The Hawaiian Shirt
The Heat
The Hula Skirt, 1959
Infrared
Instead Of Speech
The Izu Dancer
The New Father
The Older Child
The Piano
Poetic Closure
Polar
Removing A Diaphragm
Revolutions
The Room
Seams
Sense Memory
Something
Strands
The Translator
When I Heard The Red Pickup
Whiskey For M
The White Blouse
The Yogurt

References

1992 poetry books
American poetry collections